Stereo-Typical: A's, B's and Rarities is an official 3 disc compilation album of The Specials. It contains many A and B sides and some rarities. The tracks are variously credited to The Specials, The Special AKA, and other versions of the band's name.

Track listing

Disc 1

Disc 2

Disc 3

References

2000 compilation albums
The Specials compilation albums
Chrysalis Records compilation albums